Little Buffalo Historic District, is a national historic district in Centre Township and Juniata Township near Newport, Perry County, Pennsylvania, United States. It comprises a number of sites and structures which date from the iron-making era prior to 1850 when the settlement was known as Juniata Furnace.  These include the remains of the iron furnace complex, Superintendent's House (1861), cemetery, first and second levels of the Blue Ball Tavern, covered bridge known as Wahneta's of Clay's Bridge, and the hiking trail that was once the bed of the Newport and Shermans Valley Railroad.

It was listed on the National Register of Historic Places in 1978.

References 

Geography of Perry County, Pennsylvania
Historic districts on the National Register of Historic Places in Pennsylvania
1808 establishments in Pennsylvania
National Register of Historic Places in Perry County, Pennsylvania